Judy Francesconi (born May 11, 1957) is an American photographer who concentrates on black-and-white fine art photography of lesbian women.

She graduated from the University of Southern California with a degree in journalism. She is most noted for her black-and-white and sepia photography featuring beautiful (lipstick lesbian) women. Her images have appeared in galleries, books, on CDs, postcards, greeting cards, posters, and in advertising. For many years, Francesconi was the only publisher of a fine-art calendar aimed at lesbians. Her yearly calendar remains a top-seller to this day. Her first book, Stolen Moments, was published in 1997.

Bibliography 
(1997) Stolen Moments. Shake It Up Productions. .
(2000) Visual Sonnets. Shake It Up Productions. .
(2003) Intimate Moments. Shake It Up Productions. .
(2003) Passion. Shake It Up Productions. .
(2004) Tenderness. 10% Productions. .
(2006) Provocateur. 10% Productions. .
(2008) On The Lips. Judy Francesconi Publishing. .

See also
Lesbianism in erotica

References

Sources 
(1998) Beginnings: Lesbians Talk About the First Time They Met Their Long-Term Partner. Lindsey Elder. Alyson Publications. .
(1998) Awakening the Virgin. Nicole Foster. Alyson Publications. .
(1998) Love Shook My Heart. Irene Zahava. Alyson Publications. .
(2001) Celebrity: The Advocate Interviews. Judy Wieder. Advocate Books. .
(2002) Photography: Lesbian, Post Stonewall. An Encyclopedia of Gay, Lesbian, Bisexual, Transgender, & Queer Culture.
(2003) The Lesbian Sex Book: A Guide for Women Who Love Women. Wendy Caster, Rachel Kramer Bussel, and Julie May. Alyson Books. .
(2004) Subjects of the Visual Arts: Nude Females  An Encyclopedia of Gay, Lesbian, Bisexual, Transgender, & Queer Culture. 
(2006) Things - Now, Then & Strange. Kelly A. Morris. Trafford Publishing. .
(2007) Secret Lives of Women, Episode: Lipstick Lesbians. Women's Entertainment Television, WE TV.

External links 
Official Website
Boston Girl Guide
Lyman-Eyer Gallery

American photographers
1957 births
Living people
American women photographers
21st-century American women